Chelonibiidae is a family of turtle barnacles in the order Balanomorpha. There are at least three genera and about eight described species in Chelonibiidae.

Genera
These genera belong to the family Chelonibiidae:
 Chelonibia Leach, 1817
 Stephanolepas Fischer, 1886
 † Protochelonibia Harzhauser & Newman, 2011

References

Further reading

 
 

Barnacles
Crustacean families